The Korean Maritime Safety Tribunal (KMST) is an agency of the government of South Korea that investigates maritime accidents. It is subordinate to the Ministry of Land, Infrastructure and Transport (MOLIT), previously Ministry of Land, Transport and Maritime Affairs (MLTM). It was formerly subordinate to the Ministry of Oceans and Fisheries (MOF).

At one time its head office was located in the Seodaemun District of Seoul.

At a later period head office was previously located in the S1 Building in Sunhwa-dong, Jung-gu, Seoul.

See also

 Aviation and Railway Accident Investigation Board

References

External links
 Korean Maritime Safety Tribunal
 Korean Maritime Safety Tribunal 
  
  (2011-2013)
  (2003-2006)

Government agencies of South Korea
Maritime safety organizations